Jason Mark Sedlan (born 5 August 1979) is an English former professional footballer who played in the Football League for Mansfield Town.

References

1979 births
Living people
English footballers
Association football midfielders
English Football League players
Mansfield Town F.C. players
Wisbech Town F.C. players
Boston United F.C. players